Moselia is a genus of rolled-winged stoneflies in the family Leuctridae. There are at least two described species in Moselia.

Species
These two species belong to the genus Moselia:
 Moselia infuscata (Claassen, 1923) (hairy needlefly)
 Moselia zonata Stark & Harrison, 2016

References

Further reading

 
 

Plecoptera
Articles created by Qbugbot